Straitsview is a local service district in the Canadian province of Newfoundland and Labrador.

Geography 
Straitsview is in Newfoundland within Subdivision D of Division No. 9.

Government 
Straitsview is a local service district (LSD) that is governed by a committee responsible for the provision of certain services to the community. The chair of the LSD committee is Ford Blake.

See also 
List of local service districts in Newfoundland and Labrador

References 

Local service districts in Newfoundland and Labrador